Sven Eriksson may refer to:

 Sven-Göran Eriksson (born 1948), Swedish former football manager
 Sven Selånger (1907–1992), a.k.a. Sven Eriksson, Swedish Nordic skier